The Breda A.4 was a biplane trainer produced in Italy in the mid-1920s. It was of conventional configuration with a two-bay unstaggered wing cellule and seating for the pilot and instructor in tandem open cockpits. Apart from civil use, the A.4 was also adopted by the Regia Aeronautica as a trainer. At least some examples were produced in floatplane configuration as the A.4idro.

Variants
A.4 Two-seat primary training biplane, powered by a  Colombo D.110 6-cylinder water-cooled in-line engine.
A.4 HS Similar to the A.4, powered by a  Hispano-Suiza 8 V-8 water-cooled piston engine.
A.4idro Floatplane version of A.4 HS.

Operators

 Regia Aeronautica

Specifications (A.4 HS landplane)

See also

References

Further reading

External links

 Уголок неба

A.4
1920s Italian civil trainer aircraft
Biplanes
Single-engined tractor aircraft
Aircraft first flown in 1926